Mio or MIO may refer to: shortened form of Mioritic Shepherd dog or Mioritic sheepdog; a Romanian mountain dog.

Places
 Mio, Michigan, a town in the US

Music
 Mío, 2011 album by David Bustamante
 "Mío", 1992 song by Paulina Rubio

Brands and businesses
 MiO, a Kraft foods flavor product, marketed as a "liquid water enhancer"
 Mio Technology, a Taiwanese mobile electronics manufacturer (includes Mio GPS)
 mio TV, a pay-TV service by SingTel
 Yamaha Mio, a motorcycle

Science 
 Mercury Magnetospheric Orbiter, a Japanese instrument on the BepiColombo space probe

People with the surname
 Vangjush Mio (1891–1957), Albanian painter

Other uses
 Mio (given name), a feminine Japanese given name
 Mio., official German abbreviation for "million(s)"
 Abbreviation for mebioctet, a unit of information
 Michael "Mio" Nielsen (born 1965), former Danish footballer
 MIO Biwako Kusatsu, a Japanese football club in Shiga
 Maritime Interdiction Operations
 Masivo Integrado de Occidente bus transport system, Cali, Colombia
 Mio, a character from Xenoblade Chronicles 3

See also
 Mio, My Son, a 1954 children's book by Astrid Lindgren